Phir Wohi Dil Laya Hoon  ( I've come back with the same heart) is a 1963 Indian Hindi-language film.  The film became superhit at the box office. This was Nasir Hussain's second production (his first in colour), after the hit film Jab Pyar Kisi Se Hota Hai (1961). He also wrote and directed it. It starred Joy Mukherjee and the Nasir Hussain fixture Asha Parekh. Pran played the villain in the film and Rajindernath had a supporting role. It also contains many songs that Mohammed Rafi sang beautifully.

This Nasir Hussain film had O.P. Nayyar as the music director, who had previously composed Hussain's Tumsa Nahin Dekha (1957). Majrooh Sultanpuri was the lyricist.

The film included many super-hit songs such as the classical "Dekho Bijli Dole Bin Badal Ki", sung by Asha Bhosle and Usha Mangeshkar. It also included the rhythmic solo melodies like "Aankhon Se Jo Utri Hai Dil Mein", "Mujhe Pyar Mein Tum Na Ilzam Dete" (both sung by Asha Bhosle), "Lakhon Hain Nigah Mein" and "Banda Parwar, Tham Lo Jigar" (both sung by Mohammed Rafi), which are popular even today.

Plot 
Due to a growing marital rift between Jamuna and her husband, she decides to leave him. He does not permit her to take their son, so she arranges his abduction, and disappears from her husband's life. Years later, Jamuna's son, Mohan, has grown up, and together they live a middle-class existence. One day, Mohan meets with Mona and both are attracted to each other. But Mona's guardian would like her to marry Biharilal alias Difu, who is foreign returned and comes from a very wealthy family. Mona and her friends embark on a trip to Srinagar, and Mohan follows her there. Then Jamuna's overjoyed husband announces the return of his son, Mohan, back to his household. When Jamuna gets this news, she is shocked beyond words as the man claiming to be her son, is none other than an impostor named Ramesh. She will have to come out of hiding, admit to abducting Mohan, in order to bring the truth to light. But will Jamuna be willing to re-open the unpleasant past, or will she be content with the way things have turned out to be.

Cast
Joy Mukherjee... Mohan
Asha Parekh... Mona
Rajendra Nath... Dipu
Veena... Jamuna
Wasti
Krishan Dhawan... Mr. Kapoor
Tabassum... Mona's friend
Ram Avtar... Kamala
Amar
Indira Bansal
Rajendra Singh
Kanchanamala
Rani
Ranjeet Kumar
Pran... Ramesh

Songs
This Nasir Hussain film had O. P. Nayyar as the music director and Majrooh Sultanpuri as the lyricist.

References

External links
 

1963 films
1960s Hindi-language films
Films directed by Nasir Hussain
Films scored by O. P. Nayyar